Frank Stewart Scott (August 23, 1879 – February 13, 1943) was a Canadian shoe manufacturer and politician.

Born in Galt, Ontario, the son of Frank A. Scott and Mary Stewart, Scott graduated from the Galt Collegiate Institute. In 1897, he started working for the Galt Knitting Company. In 1899, he started a shoe manufacturing company with a partner, Edwin J. Getty. In 1906 the company, Getty & Scott Shoe Co. Ltd, was incorporated. In 1912, Scott became the sole owner and renamed the firm, Scott Shoe Company. In 1904, he married Minnie L. Weir.

From 1907 to 1908, he was a member of the Galt municipal council. He was reeve from 1909 to 1911 and mayor from 1912 to 1913. From 1908 to 1911, he was a member of the Waterloo County council and was reeve of Waterloo County from 1910 to 1911.

He was elected to the House of Commons of Canada for the electoral district of Waterloo South in a 1915 by-election called after the death of George Adam Clare. A Conservative, he was re-elected in the 1917 election. he was defeated in the 1921 election. Scott died in Galt at the age of 63.

Electoral record

References

1879 births
1943 deaths
Conservative Party of Canada (1867–1942) MPs
Mayors of places in Ontario
Members of the House of Commons of Canada from Ontario